Þorbjörn dísarskáld is a late-10th century Icelandic skald (poet). Only one and a half stanzas of his poetry have been preserved in Skáldskaparmál (The Language of Poetry).

Name 
Dísarskáld means "poet of the dísir", which implies that he composed verses of the female deities (dísir).

It has also been interpreted as an allusion to a now lost poem about Freyja, whom Snorri Sturluson in Skáldskaparmál calls Vanadís ("lady of the Vanir" or "dís of the Vanir") or one of the dísir.

His name is sometimes anglicized as Thorbjörn dísarskáld or Thorbiorn disarskald.

Poetry 
One and a half stanzas are found in Skáldskaparmál as a preserved part of a longer poem about the thunder-god Thor, celebrating his victories on a number of named gýgjar.

Another fragment, dealing with the christening of an unknown person, is sometimes attributed to Þorbjörn, although the attribution remains uncertain. According to Anthony Faulkes, if both poems were written by the same author, it could mean that Þorbjörn became Christian.

Notes

References

 Brodeur, Arthur Gilchrist (trans.). 1916. Snorri Sturluson: The Prose Edda. New York: The American-Scandinavian Foundation.

.

External links
 Þorbjörn's poetry in the original language.

10th-century Icelandic poets